is a private university in Kisarazu, Chiba, Japan.

External links

 Official website 

Educational institutions established in 1994
Private universities and colleges in Japan
Universities and colleges in Chiba Prefecture
Kisarazu
1994 establishments in Japan